Uzeničky is a municipality and village in Strakonice District in the South Bohemian Region, the Czech Republic. It has about 100 inhabitants.

Administrative parts

The village of Černívsko is an administrative part of Uzeničky.

References

Villages in Strakonice District